Eupithecia subtilis is a moth in the family Geometridae. It is found in Afghanistan, Iran, Uzbekistan, Kyrgyzstan, Tajikistan and Pakistan. It is found at altitudes between 1,500 and 3,500 meters.

References

Moths described in 1910
subtilis
Moths of Asia